The 2020–21 Saint Peter's Peacocks men's basketball team represented Saint Peter's University in the 2020–21 NCAA Division I men's basketball season. The Peacocks were led by third-year head coach Shaheen Holloway. Due to renovations at their regular home arena, Yanitelli Center, they played their home games at John J. Moore Athletics Center, on the campus of New Jersey City University, as members of the Metro Atlantic Athletic Conference. They finished the season 14–11, 10–8 in MAAC play to finish in a tie for third place. As the No. 3 seed in the MAAC tournament, they defeated No. 11 seed Rider in the quarterfinals, and then lost to No. 7 seed Fairfield 47–52 in the semifinals.

Previous season
The Peacocks finished the 2019–20 season 18–12 overall, 14–6 in MAAC play to finish in second place. As the #2 seed in the MAAC tournament, they defeated #7 seed Iona 56–54 in the quarterfinals. However, the semifinals and championship game, and all postseason tournaments, were cancelled amid the COVID-19 pandemic.

Roster

Schedule and results 

|-
!colspan=12 style=| Regular season

|-
!colspan=12 style=| MAAC tournament
|-

|-

Sources

References

Saint Peter's Peacocks men's basketball seasons
Saint Peter's Peacocks
Saint Peter's Peacocks basketball
Saint Peter's Peacocks basketball